Sam Webb is a Communist activist and politician.

Sam or Samuel Webb(e) may also refer to:

Other politicians
Samuel Webb (assemblyman) of 46th New York State Legislature
Samuel Webb, 1758 High Sheriff of Bristol

Sports
Sam Webb (American football)
Sam Webb (boxer)
Red Webb, Samuel Henry "Red" Webb, American baseball player

Others
Samuel Webb, associated with the 1838 building of Pennsylvania Hall (Philadelphia)
Sam Webb (architect), British architect
Sam Webb (model), British male model
Samuel Webbe, English composer
Colonel Samuel Blachley Webb of Webb's Additional Continental Regiment
Samuel Webb, actor of Drew Sharp in Dead Freight
Samuel Webb of the Skeleton Canyon shootout
Samuel B. Webb School in Wethersfield, Connecticut